Abraham Mebratu is an Ethiopian football coach.

Managerial career

Yemen

Under-22
Coach of the Yemen U22 for the 2013 AFC U-22 Championship qualification, Mebratu led the team to 1–0 victory over Nepal in their first group stage clash, facing Uzbekistan in their second and holding them to a mundane 1–1 draw. Next, he led his charges to a 5–1 triumph over Bangladesh, sealing qualification into the 2013 tournament.

Holding the post of Yemen Football Association technical director, Mebratu expressed concern for the preparation of the Under-23 players ahead of the 2016 AFC U-23 Championship due to the Yemeni Civil War which is afflicting football in Yemen by the prorogation of the local league.

Senior
Booking their place in the second round of the 2019 AFC Asian Cup qualification by beating the Maldives twice 2–0 in the play-offs, the Ethiopian-born coach praised his Yemen national team players for their efforts in the qualifying phase.

He was an instructor for a B License Coaching Course held in Ethiopia in 2012.

In March 2018, his Yemen senior team qualified for the 2019 AFC Asian Cup for the first time.

Ethiopia
On July 19, 2018, Mebratu was appointed head coach of the Ethiopian national team. In August 2020, the Ethiopian Football Federation (EFF) decided not to renew his contract amid the COVID-19 pandemic.

References

External links
 "Yemen National U-22 Coach Abraham Mebratu Visits Youth Football Training Camp", June 24, 2012, GoalNepal

1970 births
Living people
Yemen national football team managers
Ethiopia national football team managers
Ethiopian football managers
Ethiopian expatriate football managers
Ethiopian expatriate sportspeople in Yemen
Expatriate football managers in Yemen